Fighter Squadron 41 or VF-41 was an aviation unit of the United States Navy. Originally established as VF-75A on 1 June 1945, redesignated as VF-75 on 1 August 1945, redesignated as VF-3B on 15 November 1946, redesignated as VF-41 on 1 September 1948, it was disestablished in June 1950. It was the third US Navy squadron to be designated VF-41.

Operational history
 

Home port assignments
NAS Chincoteague

Aircraft assignment
F4U-4 Corsair

See also
History of the United States Navy
List of inactive United States Navy aircraft squadrons
List of United States Navy aircraft squadrons

References

External links

Strike fighter squadrons of the United States Navy